Johiya (also Joiya, Joyia or Joria) is a clan found among the  non-muslims Rajputs of India and Muslim Jatoi Baloch of Pakistan.Migrated Johiya or Joyia belongs to Baloch Tribe.After migration some of  Johiya people joined Jatoi Baloch tribe of Balochistan and carried their race forward as "Jatoiya Baloch".They were only the inhibitant of Ayudhiya but not a well definite cast.Joiya belongs to Warriors tribe which ruled on Jangladesh and was not a caste.The word Joiya is derived from Ayudhiya, India.Johiya belongs to Baloch tribe due they married their dears into Jatoi tribe during their stay in Kacchi Plain in East of Balochistan.They are found in Punjab, Muzaffargarh and various areas of Pakistan.Migration make them a well defined cast.In shortly Joiya of Pakistan is the progeny of Jatoi Baloch which is still settled.As the race increased some of Johiya Baloch also fused with Korai Tribe(the tribe from Meer Jalal Khan Baloch) and on other side Johiya Leader Sheer M Jatoiya (the cheif of jatoiya baloch tribe of Kacchi Plain) also helped Shehdad Khan and gave warriors support to Mughal Emperor Hamayun to defeat Sher Shah Suri to regain Delhi(The capital of India) throne compliance with order of Meer Chakar Khan Rind(The great chieftain and commander of Baloch Tribe).Sheer M Joiya's son  Khan Bakhtawar Joiya/Jatoiya became chief of the tribe.Sympathy and harmony is found among the other Baloch Tribes and Joiya Baloch tribe led by  descendant Khan Bakhtawar Jatoiya(the son of Sheer M Jatoi ,the successor of Nazawar Jatoi Baloch) and they are closely relatives.This community use the surname Khan and Baloch along with their names.

Origin
The Johiya may be modern-day descendants of the ancient Yaudheya warrior tribe and Jatoi Baloch tribe that ruled in some areas of northern India until the period of the Gupta empire. This theory - which was proposed by Alexander Cunningham - is not certain and it has also been mooted that they may be connected to another ancient tribe, being the Audumbaras..After migration some people of Johiya joined Jatoi Baloch tribe of Balochistan and carried their race forward as "Jatoiya Baloch".The word "Jatoiya" is used for generous people.Due to civil war between other tribes of Baloch, Jatoiya people migrated to Central Punjab.

During 18th and 19th century, the Muslim Johiya chieftains - who were vassals of Bikaner State, had ongoing tussle for the control of northeast Rajasthan (Hanumangarh) and northwest Haryana (Sirsa, Fatehabad, Rania and Hisar) with Bhatti Ranghar Rajputs and Jat Sikh rulers of Patiala and Jind States.

References

 Dr Karni Singh (1947): The Relations of House of Bikaner with Central Power, Munsi Ram Manohar Lal Pub. Pvt, 54 Rani Jhansi Road, New Delhi.
 Dasgupta, K.K. A Tribal History of Ancient India: A Numismatic Approach, Calcutta, 1974.
 Lahiri, Bela Indigenous States of Northern India (Circa 200 BC - 320 AD), University of Calcutta, 1974.
 Sheer M Johiya son of Nazawar Johiya,the leader of Jatoiya(Jatoi) Baloch tribe,Kacchi Plain East Balochistan, 1401.
 Khan Bakhtawar Joiya successor of Sheer M Joiya and leader of Jatoiya (Jatoi) Baloch tribe Central Punjab, 1488.
 Vedic and Aryan India by H. S Bhatia

Rajput clans of Rajasthan
Social groups of Rajasthan